John Knox Stewart (October 20, 1853 – June 27, 1919) was a Representative from New York.

Stewart was born in Perth, Fulton County, New York on October 20, 1853. He moved with his parents to Amsterdam, New York in 1860 and attended the public schools and Amsterdam Academy. He was engaged in the manufacture of paper until 1885, when he engaged in the manufacture of textiles; sewer commissioner of the city 1885 - 1890; a director of the Farmers’ National Bank of Amsterdam and of the Chuctanunda Gas Light Co.; vice president of the Amsterdam Board of Trade; member of the New York State Assembly (Montgomery Co.) in 1890; elected as a Republican to the 56th and 57th United States Congresses, holding office from March 4, 1899, to March 3, 1903; resumed the manufacture of textiles and continued in that business until his death in Amsterdam, N.Y. and is buried in Greenhill Cemetery.

External links
 
 

1853 births
1919 deaths
Republican Party members of the New York State Assembly
Republican Party members of the United States House of Representatives from New York (state)
19th-century American politicians